Afghanistan competed at the 1964 Summer Olympics in Tokyo.

Wrestling

Men's freestyle

Men's Greco-Roman

References

Nations at the 1964 Summer Olympics
1964
1964 in Afghan sport